Norman Woodason Johnson was a mathematician at Wheaton College, Norton, Massachusetts.

Early life and education 
His father had a bookstore and published a local newspaper.

Johnson earned his undergraduate mathematics degree in 1953 at Carleton College in Northfield, Minnesota followed by a master's degree from the University of Pittsburgh. After graduating in 1953, Johnson did alternative civilian service as a conscientious objector. He earned his PhD from the University of Toronto in 1966 with a dissertation title of The Theory of Uniform Polytopes and Honeycombs under the supervision of  H. S. M. Coxeter. From there, he accepted a position in the Mathematics Department of Wheaton College in Massachusetts and taught until his retirement in 1998.

Career
In 1966, he enumerated 92 convex non-uniform polyhedra with regular faces.  Victor Zalgaller later proved (1969) that Johnson's list was complete, and the set is now known as the Johnson solids.

Johnson is also credited with naming all the uniform star polyhedra and their duals, as published in Magnus Wenninger's model building books: Polyhedron models (1971) and Dual models (1983).

Death and final works

Works

References

External links
 
 Norman W. Johnson Endowed Fund in Mathematics and Computer Science at Wheaton College

1930 births
2017 deaths
20th-century American mathematicians
University of Toronto alumni
Wheaton College (Massachusetts) faculty